Hasan Sarhan (born 30 April 1993) is a Palestinian footballer.

Club career statistics
(correct as of August 2012)

References

External links
 

1993 births
Living people
Israeli footballers
Arab-Israeli footballers
Palestinian footballers
Palestine international footballers
Maccabi Netanya F.C. players
Ihud Bnei Majd al-Krum F.C. players
Shabab Al-Dhahiriya SC players
Hapoel Iksal F.C. players
Hapoel Bnei Rameh F.C. players
West Bank Premier League players
Footballers from Majd al-Krum
Association football forwards